The VISA Men's Soccer Tournament was a college soccer tournament for programs in the Virginia Intercollegiate Soccer Association's Virginia Intercollegiate League that was held from 1961 until 1984.

Winners

References 

Defunct NCAA Division I men's soccer conference tournaments
Soccer in Virginia
1961 establishments in Virginia
1984 disestablishments in Virginia